Leiocephalus lunatus, commonly known as the Hispaniolan maskless curlytail or Santo Domingo curlytail lizard , is a species of lizard in the family Leiocephalidae (curly-tailed lizard). It is native to the Dominican Republic.

References

Leiocephalus
Reptiles described in 1934
Reptiles of the Dominican Republic
Taxa named by Doris Mable Cochran